Rieth may refer to:

 Rieth, a district of the German city of Erfurt
 Rieth, a district of the German town of Luckow
 Rieth, Oregon, unincorporated community in Umatilla County, Oregon
 Rieth (surname)
 Andreas Rieth Homestead, historic home in Pennsylvania